On September 24, 2005, many protests against the 2003 invasion of Iraq and the Iraq War took place.

United States

Washington, D.C. 

Protesters from around the country joined the march in Washington, D.C. organized by ANSWER Coalition and United for Peace and Justice to promote peace and an end to the war in Iraq. Organizers claim that around 300,000 people attended the demonstration. Police said that 150,000 was "as good a guess as any". The demonstration route was chosen to be close to the White House, though President George W. Bush was away at the time.

Representative Cynthia McKinney, George Galloway, Carlos Arredondo, Cindy Sheehan, Jesse Jackson, and former U.S. Attorney General Ramsey Clark attended the rally.

The September 24 March also included over 300 members of Military Families Speak Out, which represents about 2,500 military families.

World Bank/IMF feeder march 
In addition to the main rally and march sponsored by ANSWER and United for Peace and Justice, the Mobilization for Global Justice sponsored a feeder march to protest the policies of the World Bank and International Monetary Fund (IMF), held to coincide with the fall meetings of the World Bank and IMF, which were happening on the same weekend.

The feeder march met at Dupont Circle.  In addition to more mainstream demonstrators, a large black bloc had gathered.  This march from Dupont Circle did not have a march permit from the D.C. government, and as such, details of the actual march route were not disclosed until the last minute.  Along with the crowd that had initially gathered, a second feeder march protesting the School of the Americas joined the World Bank/IMF group at Dupont Circle.

The Mobilization for Global Justice's feeder march ran from Dupont Circle down Connecticut Avenue and past Farragut Square, reaching Murrow Park and the World Bank.  After marching west along H Street as far as 19th Street NW, encountering police barricades on three sides, the march did an about-face and marched east along H Street to Lafayette Square, joining the main march sponsored by ANSWER and UFPJ.

Black bloc breakaway march 

Following the Mobilization for Global Justice's feeder march to the World Bank and then the White House, the Black Bloc began a separate, quite circuitous march through the streets of Washington, headed for the nearest recruitment center.  Reaching the recruitment center, police began backfiring their motorcycle engines.  A number of demonstrators unfamiliar with the tactic assumed that rubber bullets were being fired, and much of the Black Bloc scattered, seeking cover.  With the main bloc reduced to around sixty people, the Black Bloc retreated, with many scattering newspaper boxes and trash receptacles in an attempt to slow police.  The retreat ended when police charged through the group at 11th and K Streets NW.

Other U.S. cities 

Several thousand attended a rally in Dolores Park in San Francisco and rallies were also held in Los Angeles, Seattle, and Birmingham, Alabama.

United Kingdom 
Thousands joined a march from Parliament Square to Hyde Park.  Police estimate that 10,000 took part but organizers put the figure at 100,000.  The demonstration was organised by the Stop the War Coalition, the Campaign for Nuclear Disarmament (CND) and the Muslim Association of Britain (MAB).  The protest was organized to coincide with the protest in Washington, and to occur just before the beginning of that year's Labour Party Conference.

Worldwide 

Demonstrations were held in Florence, Rome, Paris and Madrid.

See also 

 Protests against the 2003 Iraq war
 List of protest marches on Washington, D.C.
 ANSWER Coalition
 United for Peace and Justice
 Veterans for Peace
 Iraq Veterans Against the War

References

External links 
 ANSWER Coalition Co-sponsor
 United for Peace and Justice Co-sponsor
 Mobilization for Global Justice Feeder march sponsor
 Protest Warrior Counter-protest group
 "My Speech at the Antiwar Rally," LewRockwell.com, 25 September 2005
 Student contingents in D.C. and San Francisco marches

Photography in Washington 
 
 
 Anarchist photos from the march
 Richard Renner's photos of the 2005-09-24 Peace March on Washington

Photography in other cities 
 Photo gallery of the protest in San Francisco

2005 protests
2005 in Washington, D.C.
September 2005 events in the United States
Protest marches in Washington, D.C.
Protests against the Iraq War
Peace marches